Sherbourne may refer to:

Sherbourne, Barbados, a populated place
Sherbourne, Warwickshire, a village in Warwickshire, England
Sherbourne (TTC), a subway station in Toronto, Ontario, Canada
River Sherbourne, a river in Coventry and Warwickshire
Sherborne, a town in Dorset, England

People with the surname
Stephen Sherbourne (born 1945), British politician

See also
Sherbourne Park, a former baseball stadium in Winnipeg, Manitoba, Canada
Sherbourne Street (disambiguation)
Sherbourne Conference Centre, Barbados
Sherborne (disambiguation)
Sherborn (disambiguation)